The Democratic Force (FD) was a social-democratic political party in Romania without parliamentary representation. It was led by the Senator and former Prime Minister Petre Roman. In 2012, the party merged with the National Liberal Party (PNL), but was dissolved by the Romanian authorities only in 2013.

Election results

Legislative elections

Presidential elections

References 

Social democratic parties in Romania